In the 2015–16 season, Al Sadd SC is competing in the Qatar Stars League for the 43rd season, as well as the Emir of Qatar Cup the Qatar Crown Prince Cup and the Champions League.

Squad list
Players and squad numbers last updated on 3 September 2021.Note: Flags indicate national team as has been defined under FIFA eligibility rules. Players may hold more than one non-FIFA nationality.

Competitions

Overview

{| class="wikitable" style="text-align: center"
|-
!rowspan=2|Competition
!colspan=8|Record
!rowspan=2|Started round
!rowspan=2|Final position / round
!rowspan=2|First match	
!rowspan=2|Last match
|-
!
!
!
!
!
!
!
!
|-
| Qatar Stars League

| Matchday 1
| 3rd
| 13 September 2015
| 15 April 2016
|-
| Emir of Qatar Cup

| Quarter-final
| style="background:silver;"| Runners–up
| 7 May 2016
| 20 May 2016
|-
| Qatar Crown Prince Cup

| colspan=2| Semi-finals
| colspan=2| 25 April 2016
|-
| Champions League

| colspan=2| Play-off round 
| colspan=2| 9 February 2016
|-
! Total

Qatar Stars League

League table

Results summary

Results by round

Matches

Emir of Qatar Cup

Qatar Cup (ex) Crown Prince Cup

AFC Champions League

Play-off round

Squad information

Playing statistics

|-
! colspan=16 style=background:#dcdcdc; text-align:center| Goalkeepers

|-
! colspan=16 style=background:#dcdcdc; text-align:center| Defenders

|-
! colspan=16 style=background:#dcdcdc; text-align:center| Midfielders

|-
! colspan=16 style=background:#dcdcdc; text-align:center| Forwards

|-
! colspan=16 style=background:#dcdcdc; text-align:center| Players transferred out during the season

Goalscorers
Includes all competitive matches. The list is sorted alphabetically by surname when total goals are equal.

Players with Multiple Nationalities
   Steven Tedga
   Mohammed Kasola
   Ibrahim Majid
   Musab Keder
   Abdelkarim Hassan
   Talal Al-Bloushi
   Hussain Ali Bahzad
   Ali Asad
   Hamza Sanhaji

For recent squad changes see List of Qatari football transfers summer 2015.

Transfers

In

Out

References

Al Sadd SC seasons
Qatari football clubs 2015–16 season